Greenboro is a transitway stop and future O-Train Trillium Line (Line 2) station in Ottawa, Ontario, Canada. It is located at Bank Street and Johnston Road at the north end of the South Keys shopping complex. The station has a 678-space paid park and ride lot reserved to monthly pass holders. The bus terminus was opened with the southern transitway on September 2, 1995.

From 2001 to 2020, Greenboro served as the southern terminus for the Trillium Line. Upon the line's relaunch in 2023, Greenboro will become a through station, while Limebank station will serve as the line's new terminus.

Service

The following routes serve Greenboro station as of May 3, 2020:

 Every route that ends at Greenboro (except for some Route 97 trips and O-Train replacement buses) ends at stop 1B 
Until 2015, A stop designated as 3A was in use by route 43 but when it was redirected to the Southeast Transitway, this stop was abandoned. This stop could go back into use when the time comes to convert the Southeast Transitway into LRT but this is not going to happen until some time after 2031.

Gallery

References

External links

OC Transpo station page
OC Transpo Area Map with O-Train station

Trillium Line stations
Railway stations in Canada opened in 2001
2001 establishments in Ontario
1995 establishments in Ontario
Transitway (Ottawa) stations